Jeshnian (also Romanized as Jeshnīān and Jashneyān; also known as Jeshnīā) is a village in Ramjerd-e Do Rural District, Dorudzan District, Marvdasht County, Fars Province, Iran. At the 2006 census, its population was 961, in 219 families.

References 

Populated places in Marvdasht County